M. Jagannadha Rao BSc, L.L.B. (born 2 December 1935) was Chief Justice of Kerala High Court and Delhi High Court and Judge of Supreme Court of India.

Brief Lifesketch
He was born on 2 December 1935 at Rajahmundry, Andhra Pradesh.  He has passed B.Sc. (Hons.) from Presidency College, Madras and L.L.B. from Osmania University. He has enrolled as an advocate in 1960.  He has practiced in the High Court of Andhra Pradesh for 22 years.  He has worked with his father Justice M. S. Ramachandra Rao and later with his paternal uncle Justice M. Krishna Rao.  He was appointed Additional Judge of High Court of Andhra Pradesh on 29 September 1982 and Permanent Judge on 29 November 1982. He was appointed Chief Justice of Kerala High Court in August 1991, Chief Justice of Delhi High Court in March 1994 and Judge of Supreme Court of India on 23 March 1997.  He has retired as Judge of Supreme Court of India on 2 December 2000. His son Justice M. S. Ramachandra Rao is currently a Judge of the Andhra Pradesh High Court.

He was vice-chairman and chairman of the Sixteenth Law Commission of India from 2001 to 2003 and Chairman of the Seventeenth Law Commission of India from 2003 to 2006. He has submitted about 26 Reports, starting from 176th Report to the 201st Report, on a variety of legal issues of contemporary relevance.

He is a member of the Academic Councils of the National Law University, Bangalore and Jodhpur, Indian Law Institute, New Delhi and Chairman of the Academic Council, Army Institute of Law, Chandigarh.

References

External links
 Official website of M. Jagannadha Rao

Telugu people
1935 births
Justices of the Supreme Court of India
Living people
Chief Justices of the Delhi High Court
20th-century Indian judges
Chief Justices of the Kerala High Court
20th-century Indian lawyers
People from Rajahmundry
People from East Godavari district